The fixture list for the 2022 Women's Super League were announced on 18 January 2022.

The regular season started in May 2022, and ended with the Grand Final on 18 September.  Dates and arrangements for the subsequent play-offs and the grand final were announced during the season.

All times are UK local time (UTC+01:00)

Regular season

Round 1

Round 2

Round 3

Round 4

Round 5

Round 6

Round 7

Round 8

Round 9

Round 10

Play-offs

Semi-finals

Grand final

Shield Final

References

RFL Women's Super League
RFL Women's Super League
RFL Women's Super League
RFL Women's Super League